The Nostra Catalunya Trophy was an annual pre-season football competition hosted by RCD Espanyol between 1974 and 1990. The guests were the best Catalan teams of the previous season excluding Espanyol and FC Barcelona.

The competition was a four team tournament and included two semi-finals and a final played before the Ciutat de Barcelona Trophy. For the first competition in 1974, the four teams were Gimnàstic de Tarragona, Girona FC, UE Lleida and UE Sant Andreu.

Winners and finals

Titles by club

Participations by club

See also
Copa Catalunya

RCD Espanyol
Catalan football friendly trophies
1974 establishments in Catalonia
1990 disestablishments in Spain
Recurring sporting events established in 1974
Recurring sporting events disestablished in 1990